Earl Scottie Carreon Thompson (born July 12, 1993) is a Filipino professional basketball player for the Barangay Ginebra San Miguel of the Philippine Basketball Association (PBA).

Early life and high school career
Thompson was born on July 12, 1993, and was named after Scottie Pippen as his father is a big Chicago Bulls fan. Thompson has American roots through his paternal great-grandfather.

Thompson started playing basketball when he was in elementary, but his game took off during his senior year in high school when he played in the Palarong Pambansa (representing Region XI) and was chosen for the Nike Elite Camp. According to him, he had no scholarship offers from top collegiate schools except for Perpetual Help.

College career
Thompson played college basketball at the University of Perpetual Help of the NCAA. In his rookie season, he was the Altas' sixth man, averaging 6.6 points, 4.2 rebounds, and 1.9 assists in 18.3 minutes per game. During his MVP year in 2014, he posted an impressive stat line of 26.5 PPG and 10.0 RPG, while leading the Altas to the Final Four. He was also included in the Mythical 5 selection in that same season. Despite dishing off triple-double performances for the Altas, he ended his college career in 2015 after his school bowed out of the Final Four contention.

Amateur career
Thompson suited up for the Hapee Fresh Fighters in the PBA D-League, where he teamed up with fellow college standouts and future draft batchmates Troy Rosario, Baser Amer, Garvo Lanete and Chris Newsome. Behind his heroics, he helped the Fresh Fighters win its first ever PBA D-League title in 2015.

Professional career
Thompson was drafted fifth overall in the 2015 PBA draft by the Barangay Ginebra San Miguel. In his first game as a pro, he scored 5 points, 3 rebounds, 6 assists, and 2 steals in 16 minutes of play in a 78–86 loss over the Purefoods Star Hotshots. Despite the fact that he only practiced with the team for less than a week and with the limited minutes he's given, his stellar play earned him praises from coach Tim Cone. In his third career game back on November 7, 2015, Thompson recorded 8 points, 4 rebounds, 2 assists and 2 steals in just 14 minutes of playing time in a 93–92 win over the Alaska Aces. On December 5, Thompson almost recorded a triple-double after putting up 9 points, 9 rebounds and 6 assists in 102–94 win over the Blackwater Elite. In the semifinals of 2016 PBA Governors' Cup, he registered a triple double performance long after Johnny Abarientos era. He was awarded later the 2016 All-Rookie Team. 

In 2018 PBA Commissioner's Cup Finals, he was awarded the PBA Finals MVP. He eventually won the 2018 PBA Mythical Second Team and PBA Most Improved Player awards.

In 2021 PBA Governors' Cup, Thompson won his first PBA Best Player of the Conference Award. In the 2021 PBA Governors' Cup Finals, he won his sixth PBA title and was judged as the Finals MVP for the second time of his career. On June 5, 2022, he was awarded the 2021 PBA Mythical First Team and the 2021 PBA Most Valuable Player.

In January 6, 2023, he was awarded with his second Best Player of the Conference award, this time in the 2022–23 PBA Commissioner's Cup.

PBA career statistics

As of the end of 2021 season

Season-by-season averages

|-
| align=left |  
| align=left | Barangay Ginebra
| 49 || 21.5 || .384 || .264 || .606 || 5.1 || 3.2 || .5 || .1 || 5.5
|-
| align=left |  
| align=left | Barangay Ginebra
| 64 || 30.5 || .459 || .271 || .565 || 7.8 || 4.4 || 1.0 || .2 || 8.5
|-
| align=left |  
| align=left | Barangay Ginebra
| 57 || 34.1 || .445 || .320 || .687 || 9.0 || 5.6 || 1.4 || .3 || 9.3
|-
| align=left |  
| align=left | Barangay Ginebra
| 52 || 31.9 || .439 || .311 || .538 || 7.3 || 5.0 || 1.3 || .4 || 8.3
|-
| align=left |  
| align=left | Barangay Ginebra
| 22 || 36.5 || .439 || .329 || .689 || 8.8 || 5.8 || 1.1 || .4 || 11.0
|-
| align=left |  
| align=left | Barangay Ginebra
| 33 || 38.3 || .479 || .363 || .700 || 9.0 || 5.4 || 1.2 || .9 || 13.9
|-class=sortbottom
| align="center" colspan="2" | Career
| 277 || 31.3 || .444 || .311 || .625 || 7.7 || 4.8 || 1.1 || .3 || 8.9

National team career
Thompson was part of the 12-man Sinag Pilipinas lineup that competed in the 2015 Southeast Asian Games and 2015 SEABA Championship, both held in Singapore, where they won gold medals in both occasions.

Player profile
Scottie Thompson is well-known for his offensive mindset and defensive versatility.

On offense, his scoring output is not that high much, just averaging 8.9 points per game in his career because of his role in the team. However, he focuses on making his teammates better by giving them on-point and accurate assists. With his play making abilities and skills, he averages 4.8 assists per game in his career. 

He is also well-known for his rebounding skills. Even at his height of 6'1, he is a great rebounder of his position and height. He can outrebound a taller opponent for he has a high vertical leap. As of the end of the 2021 PBA Governors' Cup, he has an astounding average of 7.7 rebounds per game. 

With that, he is often compared to Russell Westbrook of the NBA because of their similar playing style.

On defense, he is a well-known versatile defender and perimeter defender. He excels at forcing turnovers against opponents.

Personal life
Thompson founded his own barbershop, the Thompson’s Sports Hair Shop which opened in Digos in October 2016. According to Thompson, he is of partial American descent as his great grandfather is African American.

References

1993 births
Living people
Barangay Ginebra San Miguel draft picks
Barangay Ginebra San Miguel players
Basketball players from Davao del Sur
Competitors at the 2015 Southeast Asian Games
Filipino men's basketball players
Filipino people of African-American descent
Perpetual Altas basketball players
Philippine Basketball Association All-Stars
Philippines men's national basketball team players
Point guards
Shooting guards
Southeast Asian Games gold medalists for the Philippines
Southeast Asian Games medalists in basketball